Tai Po Mega Mall is the largest shopping mall in Tai Po, New Territories, Hong Kong. It is owned by Sun Hung Kai Properties and located at On Pong Road, the centre of Tai Po New Town. The largest tenants in the Mall are YATA and Park'n Shop.

References

External links

Tai Po Mega Mall

Shopping centres in Hong Kong
Tai Po
Sun Hung Kai Properties